Lazutkin is a surname. Notable people with the surname include: 

Aleksandr Lazutkin (born 1957), Russian cosmonaut
Anton Lazutkin (born 1994), Russian football player
Maksim Lazutkin (born 1999), Russian football player

Russian-language surnames